Makinwa is a surname. Notable people with the surname include:

Bunmi Makinwa (born 1955), Nigerian businessman
Stephen Makinwa (born 1983), Nigerian footballer
Henry Makinwa (born 1977), Nigerian footballer
Toke Makinwa (born 1984), Nigerian radio personality, television host, and author